Marvel Comics 2 is an imprint from Marvel Comics whose comic books depict an alternative future timeline for the Marvel Universe. The imprint was spun off from the events of What If? #105 (February 1998), which was the first appearance of the character Spider-Girl, Spider-Man's daughter from an alternative future. This Earth has been designated as Earth-982.

Publication history

The MC2 Universe was conceived by writer/editor Tom DeFalco as a possible alternate future for the Marvel Universe, set in the present day, with the first appearances of most Marvel heroes having taken place fifteen years earlier than in main continuity. The goal of the line was to produce comic books that were more accessible to a wider audience than Marvel’s main line of books and weren't entrenched in years of continuity, which was later repeated with the Ultimate Marvel imprint. The MC2 had a distinctly old-fashioned feel, with editorial and story choices reflecting late 80s–early 90s presentation and writing styles.

Three MC2 titles were launched in October 1998 as twelve-issue maxiseries:
Spider-Girl, starring the daughter of Spider-Man.
A-Next, featuring a new team of Avengers who come together after the original Avengers disbanded.
J2, starring the Juggernaut's son, a heroic teenager.

A-Next and J2 ended after twelve issues and were replaced by:
Fantastic Five, featuring the expanded Fantastic Four.
Wild Thing, starring Wolverine and Elektra's daughter.

Spider-Girl meanwhile continued publication. However, with the collapse of a deal to sell the comics in Kmart and Target both Fantastic Five and Wild Thing were cancelled after five issues, leaving Spider-Girl as the only title in the MC2 Universe still published. A few spin-off limited series were launched during the time Spider-Girl was published, such as Darkdevil and Spider-Girl Presents The Buzz.

The Spider-Girl title was nearly cancelled several times due to low sales. Each time, campaigns by Tom DeFalco and fans of the title prevented cancellation. Fans created a webpage, savespidergirl.com, to help drum up support for the book. In an effort to boost sales on the title, Marvel reprinted Spider-Girl in small "Digest-sized" trade paperbacks.

A five-issue limited series set in the MC2 Universe titled Last Hero Standing was printed. In 2006, Marvel released another limited series set in the MC2 Universe titled Last Planet Standing. The series was intended to wrap up all the loose ends in the MC2 Universe and destroy it at the series' conclusion. As a result, Spider-Girl was slated to be cancelled at issue 100, where the character would die. Due to backlash from DeFalco and fans, Marvel quashed the move and announced the relaunching of Spider-Girl under the title of Amazing Spider-Girl. The "Amazing" title lasted until early 2009, when the book was again cancelled due to low sales. A third title, The Spectacular Spider-Girl, was then launched. Initially a digital exclusive, the Spectacular book was incorporated into the Amazing Spider-Man Family anthology magazine. After Amazing Spider-Man Family and its successor, Web of Spider-Man, folded, a final four-issue Spectacular Spider-Girl mini-series was produced, allowing many of the long-running plot threads from the book to be tied up. The final MC2-oriented story to date, a one-shot called Spider-Girl: The End, was published in 2010, which gave the title character a happy ending while leaving the door open for further adventures.

In 2008, a prequel strip, Mr. and Mrs. Spider-Man, was launched in the pages of Amazing Spider-Man Family. DeFalco confirmed on the official Spider-Girl boards that this strip would serve as the definitive continuity of the MC2 Spider-Man timeline. However, the Mr. and Mrs. Spider-Man strips were quickly ended so the Spider-Man Family title could make room for the relaunched Spider-Girl book.

American Dream has appeared in both her own 2008 limited series and the 2011 five-issue limited series Captain America Corps, marking the first time an MC2 character has met or teamed up with characters from the mainstream Marvel universe.

Spider-Girl returned in the Spider-Verse storyline in 2014. During the story, it was revealed that when she traveled back in time to meet Spider-Man in his youth in her original series, she had entered Earth-616, the mainstream Marvel universe, before the point which it branched out into the MC2 universe. Her father, however, unfortunately died protecting May and Benjy from Daemos. As Daemos drained Peter's life force, May fled with Ben in her arms. Upon May's return home, Mary Jane passes Peter's former costume down to her, though Mayday eventually begins wearing a new outfit and eventually returns to her old one. Following Spider-Geddon it is revealed that the Multiversal entity known as The Other has chosen and sought Peter as its host, thus resurrecting him.

The MC2 Universe also appears in the Secret Wars event in the Spider-Island tie-in backup.

Comments on style
DeFalco explained in an interview his views on the MC2 imprint:

Bibliography

Titles
What If (volume 2) #105 (Marvel Comics, February 1998)
Spider-Girl #0–100, (Marvel Comics, October 1998 – July 2006)
Spider-Girl #½ (Marvel Comics/Wizard Entertainment, 1999)
Spider-Girl Annual 1999 (Marvel Comics, 1999)
A-Next #1–12 (Marvel Comics, October 1998 – September 1999)
J2 #1–12 (Marvel Comics, October 1998 – September 1999)
Fantastic Five (volume 1) #1–5 (Marvel Comics, October 1999 – February 2000)
Wild Thing #1–5 (Marvel Comics, October 1999 – February 2000)
Wild Thing #0 (Marvel Comics/Wizard Entertainment, 1999)
Spider-Girl presents The Buzz #1–3 (Marvel Comics, July 2000 – September 2000)
DarkDevil #1–3 (Marvel Comics, November 2000 – January 2001)
Last Hero Standing #1–5 (Marvel Comics, June 2005)
Last Planet Standing #1–5 (Marvel Comics, July 2006)
Amazing Spider-Girl #0–30 (Marvel Comics, October 2006 – March 2009)
Spider-man Magazine (prose story, Marvel Comics, April 2007)
Avengers Next #1–5 (Marvel Comics, November 2006 – January 2007)
Fantastic Five (volume 2) #1–5 (Marvel Comics, July 2007 – September 2007)
American Dream #1–5 (Marvel Comics, May 2008 – July 2008)
Amazing Spider-Man Family #1-8 (Marvel Comics, October 2008 - September 2009)
Web of Spider-Man (volume 2) #1-7 (Marvel Comics, December 2009 - June 2010)
Spectacular Spider-Girl #1–4 (Marvel Comics, May 2010 – August 2010)
Spider-Girl: The End One shot (Marvel Comics, September 2010)
Captain America Corps #1-5 (Marvel Comics, June 2011)

Collected editions

Digest size paperbacks

References

 
Marvel Comics imprints
Marvel Comics dimensions